Founded in Newton, Massachusetts, in 1976, the Joanne Langione Dance Center was the first American youth dance school centered on a developmental and avocational model rather than a competitive one. Currently the dance center offers instruction to students between 9 months and 18 years old in classical ballet, modern dance, contemporary dance, jazz, hip-hop and tap dance, with ballet exams administered annually by the American Academy of Ballet. The school stages sixteen public performances each year.

The school's toddler dance program, "Playdance," developed upon the cognitive insight that the sequence of music and movement constitute "brilliant neurological exercises" in early childhood, was featured on the PBS Documentary and WCVB series for Lifetime, Your Baby and Child, with Dr. Penelope Leach. The school's first complement of "Playdance" graduates was featured on Bob McGrath's Sesame Street tour in 1988.

References

Further reading
Anderson, Leslie. "Boys wonder: "Shall we dance?" Boston Globe 14 March 1999: 1.
Carlock, Marty. "'Nutcracker' reaches into suburbs." Boston Globe 30 November 1997: 21.
Taylor, Denise. "A winding walk on New Year's Eve." Boston Globe 28 December 2006: 4.

External links
Joanne Langione Dance Center
Newton Patch entry

Private schools in Massachusetts
Dance schools in the United States
Educational institutions established in 1976
Schools in Middlesex County, Massachusetts
Newton, Massachusetts
1976 establishments in Massachusetts